The 1933 British Columbia general election was the eighteenth general election in the Province of British Columbia, Canada. It was held to elect members of the Legislative Assembly of British Columbia. The election was called on September 13, 1933, and held on November 2, 1933.  The new legislature met for the first time on February 20, 1934.

The Liberal Party won a majority government.

The Official Opposition was formed by the social democratic Co-operative Commonwealth Federation, which was contesting its first election.

Because of internal discord, the provincial executive of the Conservative Party decided not to contest the election officially each local association was to act on its own. Some candidates ran as Independents, some as Independent Conservatives. Those supporting the premier, Simon Fraser Tolmie, ran as Unionist Party of British Columbia, and those grouped around William John Bowser, a former premier, ran as the Non-Partisan Independent Group. When Bowser died and the elections in Vancouver Centre and Victoria City were postponed, 4 Non-partisan and 2 Unionist candidates withdrew.

Other notable races include the election of Bridge River-Lillooet News publisher George Matheson Murray in Lillooet over Conservative Ernest Crawford Carson.  Carson's brother Robert Henry Carson ran as a Liberal, winning Kamloops.  Carson and his brother both served as cabinet ministers in later regimes. They were the sons of Robert Carson, an American who was one of the very few survivors of an Indian attack on a wagon train on the Oregon Trail and who went on to found one of the early ranches at Pavilion and whose holdings became part of the Diamond S Ranch.

Results

Notes:

* Party did not nominate candidates in the previous election.

1 Includes Conservatives who ran as Independents.

2 Results compared to those of Conservative Party in previous election.

3 One United Front candidate, C.J. McKendrick, ran in two ridings (Dewdney and Vancouver Centre) and is counted as two candidates.

Results by riding

|-
||    
|align="center"  |George Sharratt Pearson
|align="center"  |Alberni-Nanaimo<small>Liberal
||    
||    
|align="center"  |Burnaby<small>Co-operative Commonwealth Fed.
|align="center"  |Ernest Edward Winch
||    
|-
||    
|align="center"  |William James Asselstine
|align="center"  |Atlin<small>Liberal
||    
||    
|align="center"  |Delta<small>Co-operative Commonwealth Fed.
|align="center"  |Robert Swailes
||    
|-
||    
|align="center"  |Donald Morrison MacKay
|align="center"  |Cariboo<small>Liberal
||    
||    
|align="center"  |Mackenzie<small>Co-operative Commonwealth Fed.
|align="center"  |Ernest Bakewell
||    
|-
||    
|align="center"  |Edward Dodsley Barrow
|align="center"  |Chilliwack<small>Liberal
||    
||    
|align="center"  |North Vancouver<small>Co-operative Commonwealth Fed.
|align="center"  |Harley Christian Erskine Anderson
||    
|-
||    
|align="center"  |William Henry Sutherland
|align="center"  |Columbia-Revelstoke<small>Liberal
||    
||    
|align="center" rowspan=2 |Vancouver East<small>Co-operative Commonwealth Fed.
|align="center"  |John Price
||    
|-
||    
|align="center"  |Laurence Arnold Hanna
|align="center"  |Comox<small>Liberal
||    
||    
|align="center"  |Harold Edward Winch
||    
|-
||    
|align="center"  |Frank Mitchell MacPherson
|align="center"  |Cranbrook<small>Liberal
||    
||    
|align="center"  |Victoria City<small>Co-operative Commonwealth Fed.
|align="center"  |Robert Connell 2
||    
|-
||    
|align="center"  |David William Strachan
|align="center"  |Dewdney<small>Liberal
||    
||    
|align="center"  |Fernie<small>Independent Labour Party
|align="center"  |Thomas Aubert Uphill
||    
|-
||    
|align="center"  |Henry George Thomas Perry
|align="center"  |Fort George<small>Liberal
||    
||    
|align="center"  |Peace River<small>Non-Partisan Independent Group
|align="center"  |Clive Montgomery Francis Planta
||    
|-
||    
|align="center"  |Dougald MacPherson
|align="center"  |Grand Forks-Greenwood<small>Liberal
||    
||    
|align="center"  |Salmon Arm<small>Non-Partisan Independent Group
|align="center"  |Rolf Wallgren Bruhn
||    
|-
||    
|align="center"  |Alexander McDonald
|align="center"  |The Islands<small>Liberal
||    
||    
|align="center"  |Cowichan-Newcastle<small>Oxford Group Movement
|align="center"  |Hugh George Egioke Savage
||    
|-
||    
|align="center"  |Robert Henry Carson
|align="center"  |Kamloops<small>Liberal
||    
||    
|align="center"  |Esquimalt<small>Unionist
|align="center"  |Robert Henry Pooley
||    
|-
||    
|align="center"  |Charles Sidney Leary
|align="center"  |Kaslo-Slocan<small>Liberal
||    
||    
|align="center"  |Victoria City<small>Independent
|align="center"  |Herbert Anscomb
||    
|-
||    
|align="center"  |George Matheson Murray
|align="center"  |Lillooet<small>Liberal
||    
|-
||    
|align="center"  |Frank Putnam
|align="center"  |Nelson-Creston<small>Liberal
||    
|-
||    
|align="center"  |Arthur Wellesley Gray
|align="center"  |New Westminster<small>Liberal
||    
|-
||    
|align="center"  |Kenneth Cattanach MacDonald
|align="center"  |North Okanagan<small>Liberal
||    
|-
||    
|align="center"  |Alexander Malcolm Manson
|align="center"  |Omineca<small>Liberal
||    
|-
||    
|align="center"  |Thomas Dufferin Pattullo1
|align="center"  |Prince Rupert<small>Liberal
||    
|-
||    
|align="center"  |Richard Ronald Burns
|align="center"  |Rossland-Trail<small>Liberal
||    
|-
||    
|align="center"  |Norman William Whittaker
|align="center"  |Saanich<small>Liberal
||    
|-
||    
|align="center"  |Charles Herbert Percy Tupper
|align="center"  |Similkameen<small>Liberal
||    
|-
||    
|align="center"  |Edward Tourtellotte Kenney
|align="center"  |Skeena<small>Liberal
||    
|-
||    
|align="center"  |Joseph Allen Harris
|align="center"  |South Okanagan<small>Liberal
||    
|-
||    
|align="center"  |Gerald Grattan McGeer
|align="center" rowspan=2 |Vancouver-Burrard<small>Liberal
||    
|-
||    
|align="center"  |Helen Douglas Smith
||    
|-
||    
|align="center"  |Gordon McGregor Sloan
|align="center" rowspan=2 |Vancouver Centre<small>Liberal
||    
|-
||    
|align="center"  |Gordon Sylvester Wismer
||    
|-
||    
|align="center"  |George Moir Weir
|align="center" rowspan=3 |Vancouver-Point Grey<small>Liberal
||    
|-
||    
|align="center"  |Stanley Stewart McKeen
||    
|-
||    
|align="center"  |Robert Wilkinson
||    
|-
||    
|align="center"  |John Hart
|align="center" rowspan=2 |Victoria City<small>Liberal
||    
|-
||    
|align="center"  |Byron Ingemar Johnson
||    
|-
||    
|align="center"  |John Joseph Alban Gillis
|align="center"  |Yale<small>Liberal
||    
|-
|-
|
|align="center"|1  Premier-Elect
|
|
|
|
|-
|
|align="center"|2  Leader of the Opposition
|-
| align="center" colspan="10"|Source:''' Elections BC
|-
|}

See also
List of British Columbia political parties

Notes

References

Further reading
 

1933
1933 elections in Canada
1933 in British Columbia
November 1933 events